The Wild and Wonderful Whites of West Virginia is a 2009 documentary film directed by Julien Nitzberg, chronicling the White family of Boone County, West Virginia.

Synopsis
The film follows the White family over the course of a year in their daily life through first-person interviews. The film mentions the details of the death of patriarch Donald Ray "D. Ray" White, as well as his rise to stardom as one of the most famous mountain dancers of his time. The illness of his widow, Bertie Mae White, is documented throughout the course of the film. Locals consider Bertie Mae "The Miracle Woman" because of her lifelong dedication to raising abandoned children. Throughout the film, Bertie is seen supporting her family despite her intolerance of their dangerous and reckless behavior. The younger generations of Whites are followed to drug deals, criminal trials, hospital beds, and jail cells to recount the wild and outlandish events in their lives. A group of local professionals in Boone County act as a Greek chorus as they speak about the Whites, mostly criticizing their negative influence on the community.

Stemming from generations of coal miners working in risky job conditions, most of the White family possesses a fatalistic attitude and a lack of fear of death. Various members recall violent fights with neighbors, family members, and other locals. Other legal troubles include larceny, prescription fraud, shootings, armed robbery, forgery, stabbings, and child custody battles. D. Ray worked in the coal mines during the scrip payment era; Mamie explains how D. Ray's frustration with his employers' corrupt practices led him to "outsmarting the system." D. Ray legally signed each of his children up for "crazy checks" during their early adolescence. Mamie discloses to the audience that each month, she (and all the other offspring of D. Ray and Bertie Mae) receive social security checks monthly from the government due to their inability to hold employment because of alleged psychiatric disability.

The Whites
Six of D. Ray and Bertie's 13 children are featured in the film.

D. Ray and Bertie's children
 Jesco White (born 1956) – son of D. Ray and Bertie; a well-known mountain dancer, he was previously the subject of the documentary film Dancing Outlaw.
 Mamie White – oldest daughter of D. Ray and Bertie; girlfriend of Billy Hastings; she introduces the family at the start of the film. Mamie tells of her brother Dorsey White, who was shot in the face during a dispute with neighbors and lost an eye; he later died of an unintentional self-inflicted gunshot wound. Mamie's boyfriend Billy Hastings is a central figure in the family's past and present. His involvement in a dispute led to the shooting death of D. Ray White by Steve Roe. His altercation with Brandon Poe is described in detail in the film.
 Ona Fontaine White - 1951-1971 - daughter of D. Ray and Bertie; murdered by ex-husband Clyde Davis.
 Bo White – daughter of D. Ray and Bertie; mother of Kirk White and Derek Castle.
 Poney White – the only one of D. Ray and Bertie's children to have left Boone County at the time the documentary was produced. He moved to Minneapolis and is a house painter. Poney states he felt he needed to leave West Virginia to improve his life, a decision he made after a prescription fraud conviction. Despite leaving the public-school system in seventh grade, Poney is one of the few employed members of the family. His daughter Virginia recounts her inability to obtain employment due to her last name before they relocated. His son Jerry rehashes mistreatment from educators in the local school just because of his lineage.
 Sue Bob White – the youngest of D. Ray and Bertie's children; she is a former stripper and the mother of Brandon and Ashley Poe.

Grandchildren/cousins
 Kirk White – daughter of Bo White; and sister of Derek Castle. Kirk's children, Monica and Tylor, are featured in the film. During the film she gives birth to Monica, who is taken away by Child Protective Services. Kirk checks herself into an alcohol and drug rehab facility in order to regain custody. Kirk later relinquished her rights to Monica in hopes for a better life for her. 
 Derek Castle – son of Bo White; brother of Kirk White. Currently lives in WV and is working to better his life. 
 Brandon Poe – son of Sue Bob White; he is currently serving a sentence of 50 years at the Huntsville Correctional Center for the attempted murder of Billy Hastings.
 Mousie White – eldest daughter of Mamie White; she is shown being released from prison, locating her estranged husband. 
Donald Maris White Jr. "Little Man"- Son of Mark White. Lives in Minnesota. Does well for himself as a painter. Married and has 3 children.

Critical response
On Rotten Tomatoes it has an approval rating of 60% based on reviews from 10 critics.

Soundtrack

See also
 Jesco White
 D. Ray White

References

External links

  offline May 2018
 
 

2009 documentary films
American documentary films
West Virginia culture
Documentary films about Appalachia
Films set in West Virginia
Films shot in West Virginia
Documentary films about families
2009 films
Dickhouse Productions films
Documentary films about West Virginia
2000s English-language films
2000s American films